True Identity is a 1991 American comedy film directed by Charles Lane and starring Lenny Henry, Frank Langella and Anne-Marie Johnson. The plot revolves around a black man (Henry), who disguises himself as a white man to escape the mob.

Plot
A struggling black actor named Miles Pope is on a plane ride home from a failed acting audition. Miles meets a producer named Leland Carver who accidentally reveals his mafia ties when he believes that their plane is about to crash. However, the plane does not crash and Miles is the only man who knows Leland's past. To escape, Miles persuades his makeup artist friend Duane to transform him into a Caucasian male.

As Miles is packing his bags to get out of town, a hitman walks in and a struggle ensues. Miles kills the hitman, but through a comedy of errors he is mistaken for the hitman. Miles must assume a parade of identities to stay one step ahead of the mafia on his trail.

Cast
 Lenny Henry as Miles Pope
 Frank Langella as Leland Carver
 Anne-Marie Johnson as Kristi
 James Earl Jones as himself
 Charles Lane as Duane
 Peggy Lipton as Rita
 Melvin Van Peebles as Taxi Driver
 J. T. Walsh as Houston
 Andreas Katsulas as Anthony
 Austin Pendleton as Othello's Director

Reception
The film received mediocre reviews. Caryn James of The New York Times said that Lane's direction was "tame and conventional" and that although Henry had "obvious" talent, True Identity does not take enough advantage of it". Lenny Henry commented on the film retrospectively in 2010: "When I went to America to do True Identity in 1991, I realised they had their own Richard Pryor, they didn’t need me pretending to be Richard Pryor, so I had a massive career rethink." The film was not a box office success.

References

External links

 
 
 

1991 films
1991 comedy films
Touchstone Pictures films
Films with screenplays by Andy Breckman
African-American comedy films
Films directed by Charles Lane (filmmaker)
1990s English-language films
1990s American films
Films about race and ethnicity